Antisocialites is the second studio album by Canadian indie pop band Alvvays, released on September 8, 2017, through Polyvinyl, Royal Mountain, Transgressive and Inertia.

Recording and production 
According to frontwoman Molly Rankin, Antisocialites was recorded using a combination of Pro Tools and a TASCAM 488 8-track recorder.

Musical Style 
The music is described by fans as having a more focused and radio-friendly sound than their self-titled album, while incorporating their original fuzzy styled guitars with catchy indie rock hooks.

Critical reception
Antisocialites received positive reviews from critics. In a review from Pitchfork, critic Marc Hogan praised the album as being "thoroughly accomplished". Several critics noted that the album was darker than the band's 2014 debut -- Paste Magazine writer Steven Edelstone found the band's comparatively more serious lyrical content as "uneasy", but still a "record that begs to be blasted on road trips and at rooftop parties", while Mike Katzif of NPR interpreted the album's lead track "In Undertow" as a "darker spiritual sequel" to their 2014 breakthrough single "Archie, Marry Me". Canadian music magazine Exclaim ranked Antisocialites as their #1 album in their 2017 year-end list of pop and rock albums, drawing attention to the album's songwriting and "plain and simple" approach.

Accolades
Antisocialites won the Juno Award for Alternative Album of the Year in 2018. The album was also a shortlisted finalist for the 2018 Polaris Music Prize.

Track listing

Personnel
Credits adapted from the album liner notes.

Alvvays
Kerri MacLellan – Farfisa, vocals
Brian Murphy – bass, guitar
Alec O'Hanley – guitars, vocals, Realistic, bass, recording, production, artwork, mixing
Molly Rankin – vocals, guitars, fiddle, artwork
Chris Dadge – drums, percussion

Additional musicians
Moshe Fisher-Rozenberg – drums
Jeremy Gaudet – guitars
Isaac Takeuchi – cello
Norman Blake – glockenspiel, vocals

Technical and artwork

John Congleton – recording, production
Celso Estrada – engineer
Tyler Karmen – engineer
Marta Salogni – engineer
Alex Gamble – engineer
Graham Walsh – engineer
Kenny Meehan – engineer
Matt Estep – mixing
Justin Nace – additional mixing
David Ives – mastering
Anthony Stewart – photography

Charts

References

2017 albums
Alvvays albums
Polyvinyl Record Co. albums
Transgressive Records albums
Juno Award for Alternative Album of the Year albums
Albums produced by John Congleton
Albums recorded at Tarbox Road Studios
Albums recorded at Kingsize Soundlabs